Rain is a collection of poetry by the Scottish poet Don Paterson. It was published in 2009 by Faber and Faber and won the Forward poetry prize for best poetry collection of the same year.

Contents

Rain opens with a quote from Antonio Porchia and Paterson regularly works off the work of other writers (often non-English language writers) such as Slavoj Žižek, Li Po, and César Vallejo. Rain contains 30 poems. Aside from the title poem some of the more famous poems included are: 
 Two Trees 
 The Swing 
 Renku: My Last Thirty-Five Deaths 
 The Bathysphere 
 Phantom

The collection features poems dedicated to both of Paterson's children, the founder of origami Akira Yoshizawa, and the poet Michael Longley; the book is also dedicated, as a whole, to Michael Donaghy. As in his earlier collections, Paterson uses Scottish Dialect in many of the shorter lyrics in this work - words such as 'tae', 'och', 'wi' and 'gairdie'. He sometimes glosses such dialects, as in 'The Human Shield', but does not always, as in 'Verse'. In comparison to his eelier collections, Paterson's use of traditional forms seems limited: Rain features only one Sonnet, 'Miguel', a form that would dominate his next collection 40 Sonnets (2015), as well as a Renku, and many poems of quatrain stanzas. However he predominantly writes in free verse, and blank verse.

Bibliography

Notes

British poetry collections
2009 poetry books
Faber and Faber books